The Landward House, also known as the Robinson-Marvin-Wheeler House, is a brick Italianate mansion in Louisville, Kentucky.  It has a limestone facade and projected entrance.  There are 22 rooms and six bathrooms in this three-story building.  Dr. Stuart Robinson used the mansion as his office. The garden was created by Frederick Law Olmsted, Jr. in 1929.  The tertiary garden features a vegetable garden, a labyrinth garden, and an informal side garden. The St. James Court Art Show uses its carriage house for its office.

It was placed on the National Register of Historic Places on September 20, 1973.

It is adjacent to the National Register-listed St. James-Belgravia Historic District, which was the site of the 1883 Southern Exposition.

References

Houses in Louisville, Kentucky
19th-century buildings and structures in Louisville, Kentucky
Houses on the National Register of Historic Places in Kentucky
Renaissance Revival architecture in Kentucky
Houses completed in 1871
National Register of Historic Places in Louisville, Kentucky
1871 establishments in Kentucky
Frederick Law Olmsted works